Caulonomus rhizophagoides is a species of beetles in the family Laemophloeidae, the only species in the genus Caulonomus.

References

Laemophloeidae
Monotypic Cucujoidea genera